Pilidiostigma is a genus of shrubs and small trees in the myrtle family Myrtaceae. All species occur in Australia and one, P. papuanum, also occurs in Papua New Guinea. They are not generally known to horticulture.  The species P. sessile is rare.

Species include:

Pilidiostigma glabrum Burret - plum myrtle 
Pilidiostigma papuanum (Lauterb.) A.J.Scott
Pilidiostigma rhytispermum (F.Muell.) Burret 
Pilidiostigma sessile N.Snow 
Pilidiostigma tetramerum L.S.Sm. 
Pilidiostigma tropicum L.S.Sm. - apricot myrtle

References

Myrtaceae
Myrtaceae genera
Myrtales of Australia
Flora of Papua New Guinea
Taxa named by Max Burret